Lake Washington is a large freshwater lake adjacent to the city of Seattle. It is the largest lake in King County and the second largest natural lake in the state of Washington, after Lake Chelan. It borders the cities of Seattle on the west, Bellevue and Kirkland on the east, Renton on the south and Kenmore on the north, and encloses Mercer Island. The lake is fed by the Sammamish River at its north end and the Cedar River at its south.

Lake Washington received its present name in 1854 after Thomas Mercer suggested it be named after George Washington, as the new Washington Territory had been named the year before. Earlier names for the lake include the Duwamish name Xacuabš (Lushootseed: literally "xacu" great-amount-of-water + "abš" people), which referred to peoples who stayed along the coastline of Lake Washington, as well as Lake Geneva by Isaac N. Ebey; Lake Duwamish in railroad surveys under Governor Isaac Stevens; At-sar-kal in a map sketched by engineer Abiel W. Tinkham; and the Chinook Jargon name, "Hyas Chuck," or "It-Kow-Chug" 'big lake'.

The lake provides sport fishing opportunities. Some species found in this lake are Coastal Cutthroat Trout, Rainbow Trout, Largemouth Bass, Smallmouth Bass, Yellow Perch, and Black Crappie.

Geography
A ribbon lake, Lake Washington is long, narrow and finger-like. Ribbon lakes are excavated by glaciers. As the Puget lobe of the Cordilleran Ice Sheet flowed south near the end of the Late Pleistocene, it met bands of harder and softer rock. Erosion of the softer rock was faster and a linear depression was created in the flow direction. When the glacier melted, the lake filled with the meltwater, which was retained by moraine deposits. A dam can also be created by the bands of harder rock either side of the softer rock. There is usually a river at both ends of a ribbon lake, one being the inlet, and the other, the outlet—though in the case of present-day Lake Washington, inlet rivers are located at both ends, with a man-made outlet in the middle. Two seaplane bases, Kenmore Air Harbor and Will Rogers – Wiley Post Memorial Seaplane Base,  have air travel passenger terminals.

Creeks and rivers

The main inflowing rivers are the Sammamish and Cedar Rivers, with the Cedar supplying most of the water.  Seasonal changes in the flow of the Sammamish are moderated by a weir at the Lake Sammamish inlet.

The lake is drained by the Lake Washington Ship Canal.

In addition, there are numerous small creeks and rivers which feed the lake, including:

 Coal Creek
 Denny Creek (O.O. Denny Park)
 Fairweather Creek
 Forbes Creek
 Juanita Creek
 Kelsey Creek
 Little Creek
 Lyon Creek
 Mapes Creek
 May Creek
 McAleer Creek
 Mercer Slough
 Ravenna Creek
 Taylor Creek
 Thornton Creek
 Yarrow Creek
 Yesler Creek

Historically, construction of the Lake Washington Ship Canal drastically changed the inflow and outflow of the lake.  Before construction of the canal in 1916, Lake Washington's outlet was the Black River, which joined the Duwamish River and emptied into Elliott Bay. When the canal was opened the level of the lake dropped nearly nine feet (2.7 m). The canal became the lake's sole outlet, causing the Black River to dry up and disappear.  Before construction, the Sammamish River was the primary source of water for Lake Washington. The lowering of the lake slightly increased the flow of the Sammamish.  As part of the ship canal project, the Cedar River was diverted into Lake Washington, to become the primary source of water for Lake Washington.

Canals and bridges

The Montlake Cut, part of the Lake Washington Ship Canal, connects the lake to Lake Union and ultimately Puget Sound.

Concrete floating bridges are employed to span the lake because Lake Washington's depth and muddy bottom prevented the emplacement of the pilings or towers necessary for the construction of a causeway or suspension bridge. The bridges consist of hollow concrete pontoons that float atop the lake, anchored with cables to each other and to weights on the lake bottom. The roadway is constructed atop these concrete pontoons. Three floating bridges cross Lake Washington: the Evergreen Point Floating Bridge (officially the SR 520 Albert D. Rosellini Evergreen Point Floating Bridge) carries State Route 520 from Seattle's Montlake neighborhood to Medina while the Lacey V. Murrow Memorial Bridge and the Third Lake Washington Bridge (officially the Homer M. Hadley Memorial Bridge) carry Interstate 90 from Seattle's Mount Baker neighborhood to Mercer Island. The East Channel Bridge carries Interstate 90 from Mercer Island to Bellevue. The Evergreen Point, Lacey V. Murrow, and Third Lake Washington bridges are the longest, second longest, and fifth longest floating bridges in the world, respectively.

Many questioned the wisdom of concrete floating bridge technology after the sinking of a portion of the Lacey V. Murrow bridge on November 25, 1990. However, a Washington State Department of Transportation (WSDOT) investigation revealed that the incident resulted from the improper handling of hydrodemolition water being used during bridge renovations, rather than in any basic flaw in the bridge's concept or design. Concrete floating bridges continue to remain a viable means for the conveyance of vehicle traffic over Lake Washington.

In 1950, approximately one year after the tolls were removed from the Murrow bridge, the inland ferry system on the lake came to an end, having operated since the 1880s.

Shoreline cities and towns
The cities and towns bordering the lake, going clockwise from the west, are Seattle, Lake Forest Park, Kenmore, Kirkland, Yarrow Point, Hunts Point, Medina, Bellevue, Beaux Arts Village, and Renton. The city of Mercer Island occupies the island of the same name, in the southern half of the lake.

Water purity
Around 1900, Seattle began discharging sewage into Lake Washington. During the 1940s and 1950s, eleven sewage treatment plants were sending state-of-the-art treated water into the lake at a rate of 20 million gallons per day. At the same time, phosphate-based detergents came into wide use. The lake responded to the massive input of nutrients by developing unpleasant blooms of noxious blue-green algae (cyanobacteria). The water lost its clarity, the desirable fish populations declined, and masses of dead algae accumulated on the shores of the lake. After significant pollution, the October 5, 1963 issue of the Post Intelligencer referred to the lake as "Lake Stinko". Citizen concern led to the creation of a system that diverted the treatment-plant effluents into nearby Puget Sound, where tidal flushing would mix them with open-ocean water. The diversion was complete by 1968, and the lake responded quickly. The algal blooms diminished, the water regained its clarity, and by 1975, recovery was complete. Careful studies by a group of limnologists from the University of Washington showed that phosphate was the culprit. Since then, Lake Washington has undergone major improvements, drastically improving the ecology and water quality, making the water twice as clear as it was in 1950.

See also
Mount Baker Crew rowing club
Seafair Cup hydroplane races

References

Washington
Washington
Seattle metropolitan area